Events from the year 1689 in Sweden

Incumbents
 Monarch – Charles XI

Events

 - The Riksdag of the Estates grant the monarch the right to taxation during war. 
 - Opposition from the Riksdag to the monarch is deemed Lèse-majesté. 
 - Helicons Blomster by Lasse Lucidor. 
 - Husqvarna Group if founded.
 - Alliance between Sweden and Lüneburg toward Denmark.

Births

 - Lars Gathenhielm, pirate and royal privateer (died 1718) 
 unknown - Margareta Gyllenstierna, politically active countess (died 1740)

Deaths
 24 February - Elsa Elisabeth Brahe, duchess (born 1632) 
 - Christina, Queen of Sweden, former monarch (born 1626) 
 - Adolph John I, Count Palatine of Kleeburg, duke (born 1629)

References

 
Years of the 17th century in Sweden
Sweden